Louise Cotnoir (born December 6, 1948) is a Canadian writer living in Quebec.

Biography
She was born in Sorel and received a bachelor's degree in literary studies from the Université du Québec à Montréal and a master's degree in medieval studies from the Université de Montréal. She taught literature at the Cégep de Thetford from 1973 until she retired in 2007. 

Her 1996 collection of poetry Dis-moi que j'imagine was a finalist for the Governor General's Award for French-language poetry and for the Prix Alain-Grandbois.

Her work has been translated into English, Spanish, Catalan, Swedish, Finnish and Chinese.

She was a member of the editorial board for the Canadian bilingual journal Tessera from 1989 to 1993. Cotnoir contributed to and served on the editorial board for the journal Arcade. She also has contributed to various Canadian and European periodicals including , Estuaire, Lèvres urbaines, Trivia, El Ciervo, Cahiers internationaux du symbolisme and Room of One's Own.

 Selected works 
 Si Cendrillon pouvait mourir, play (1980)
 Plusieures, poetry (1984)
  Les Rendez-vous par correspondance, poetry (1984)
 L'audace des mains, poetry (1987)
 Comme une chienne à la mort, poetry (1987)
 La théorie, un dimanche, "collaborative feminist poetics text" (1988), translated into English as Theory, A Sunday, with Louky Bersianik, Nicole Brossard, Gail Scott, Louise Dupré and France Théoret
 Signature païenne, poetry (1989)
 Asiles, poetry (1991)
 Des nuits qui créent le déluge, poetry (1994)
 Nous sommes en alarme, poetry (2000)
 Carnet américain, short stories (2003)
 Les îles, poetry (2005), nominated for a Governor General's Award, translated as The Islands (2011)
 Le Cahier des villes'', short stories (2009)

References 

1948 births
Living people
Université du Québec à Montréal alumni
Université de Montréal alumni
Canadian women dramatists and playwrights
Canadian women poets
Canadian women short story writers